The language of the neighboring villages of Kaachai and Padāng in Manipur, India, constitute a Tangkhulic language. It is spoken by about 3,000 people in Kachai village, west-central Ukhrul District. Phadāng is only attested from 1859.

References

Mortensen, David R. and James A. Miller (2013). “A reconstruction of Proto-Tangkhulic rhymes.” Linguistics of the Tibeto-Burman Area 36(1): 1-32.
Mortensen, David R. (2012). Database of Tangkhulic Languages. (unpublished ms. contributed to STEDT).
Mortensen, David R. and James A. Miller (2009). “Proto-Tangkhul Onsets in Comparative Perspective.” International Conference on Sino-Tibetan Languages and Linguistics 42, Chiangmai, November 4. 
Mortensen, David R. (2003). “Comparative Tangkhul.” Unpublished Qualifying Paper, UC Berkeley.
Mortensen, David. 2014. The Tangkhulic Tongues - How I Started Working on Endangered Languages.

Tangkhulic languages